This page details statistics about the Los Angeles Rams American football franchise, formerly the St. Louis Rams and the Cleveland Rams.

Franchise firsts
First NFL game – A 28–0 loss to the Detroit Lions, 9/10/37.
First NFL win – A 21–3 victory over the Philadelphia Eagles, 9/17/37.
First winning season – 1945 (9–1).
First championship season – 1945.
First player drafted – Johnny Drake, 1937.
First Ram elected to the Hall of Fame – QB Bob Waterfield, 1965.
First to pass 400 yards in a game – Jim Hardy, 406 yards vs. Chicago Cardinals, 10/31/48.
First to rush 200 yards in a game – Dan Towler, 205 yards vs. the Baltimore Colts, 11/22/53.
First 1,000-yard rusher in a season – Dick Bass, 1,033 yards (1962).
First Super Bowl appearance – A 31–19 loss to the Pittsburgh Steelers in Super Bowl XIV, 1/20/80.

Wins/losses in a season
Most games won in a season (regular season): 14, 2001
Most games won in a season (including postseason): 16, 1999, 2001
Most games lost in a season: 15, 2009

Individual records

Appearances
Most seasons in a Rams uniform – 20, Jackie Slater, (1976–1995).
Most games played in a Rams uniform – 259, Jackie Slater, (1976–1995).
Most consecutive games played in a Rams uniform – 201, Jack Youngblood, (1971–1984).
Most Pro Bowls – 14, Merlin Olsen, (1962–1975).

Game
Points – 24, eleven times, last time by Todd Gurley, vs Seattle Seahawks, 12/17/17
Touchdowns – 4, eleven times, last time by Todd Gurley, vs Seattle Seahawks, 12/17/17
Rushing yards – 247, Willie Ellison, vs Green Bay Packers, 12/05/71
Rushing touchdowns – 4, Marshall Faulk, vs Minnesota Vikings, 12/10/00
Passing yards – 554, Norm Van Brocklin, vs New York Yanks, 28 September 1951
Passing touchdowns – 5, 10 times, last time by Jared Goff, vs Minnesota Vikings, 09/27/18
Receptions – 18, Tom Fears, vs Green Bay Packers, 12/03/50
Receiving yards – 336, Willie "Flipper" Anderson, vs New Orleans Saints, 11/26/89
Receiving touchdowns – 4, four times, last time by Isaac Bruce, vs San Francisco 49ers, 10/10/99
Total yards – 336 (336 receiving), Willie "Flipper" Anderson, vs New Orleans Saints, 11/26/89
Interceptions – 3, many times, last time by Keith Lyle, vs Atlanta Falcons, 12/15/96
Sacks – 5, Gary Jeter, vs Los Angeles Raiders, 09/18/88
Field goals – 7, Greg Zuerlein, at Dallas Cowboys, 10/01/17
Punts – 12, two times, last time by Rusty Jackson, vs San Francisco 49ers, 11/21/76
Punting average yards – 56.4, Johnny Hekker, vs Philadelphia Eagles, 12/10/17
Kickoff returns – 8, Tony Horne, vs Kansas City Chiefs, 10/22/00
Kickoff return yards – 267, Tony Horne, vs Kansas City Chiefs, 10/22/00
Punt returns – 7, nine times, last time by Pharoh Cooper, vs Seattle Seahawks, 12/17/17
Punt return yards – 207, LeRoy Irvin, vs Atlanta Falcons, 11/14/81

Season
Points – 163 Jeff Wilkins (2003)
Touchdowns – 26 (18-run, 8-pass) Marshall Faulk (2000)
Rushing yards – 2,105 Eric Dickerson (1984)
Rushing touchdowns – 18, two times, last time by Marshall Faulk (2000)
Passer rating – 109.2 Kurt Warner (1999)
Passing yards – 4,886 Matthew Stafford (2021)
Passing touchdowns – 41 tied Kurt Warner (1999) and Matthew Stafford (2021)
Most wins by a starting quarterback – 14 Kurt Warner (2001) 
Receptions –  145 Cooper Kupp (2021)
Receiving yards – 1,947 Cooper Kupp (2021)
Receiving touchdowns – 17 Elroy "Crazylegs" Hirsch (1951)
Total yards – 2,429 (1,381 rushing, 1,048 receiving) Marshall Faulk (1999)
Interceptions – 14 Dick "Night Train" Lane (1952)
Sacks – 20.5 Aaron Donald (2018)
Field goals –  39 Jeff Wilkins (2003)
Punts – 105 Donnie Jones (2011)
Punting average yards – 47.93 Johnny Hekker (2015)
Kickoff returns –  66 Danny Amendola (2009)
Kickoff return yards –  1,618 Danny Amendola (2009)
Punt returns –  56 Eddie Brown (1979)
Punt return yards – 618 Jackie Wallace (1978)

Rookie season
Points –  120, Eric Dickerson (1983)
Touchdowns –  20, Eric Dickerson (1983)
Field goals –  29, Frank Corral (1978)
Receptions – 62, Cooper Kupp (2017)
Receiving yards –  924, Eddie Kennison (1996)
Receiving touchdowns – 10, Bucky Pope (1964)
Rushing yards – 1,808, Eric Dickerson (1983)
Rushing touchdowns – 18, Eric Dickerson (1983)
Total yards – 2,212, (1,808 rushing, 404, receiving), Eric Dickerson (1983)
Passer rating – 81.8, Dieter Brock (1985)
Passing yards – 3,512, Sam Bradford (2010)
Passing touchdowns – 18, Sam Bradford (2010)
Most wins by a starting quarterback
Interceptions – 14, Dick "Night Train" Lane (1952)
Sacks – 9.0, Aaron Donald (2014)
Punts – 93, Ken Clark (1979)
Punting average – 45.8, Johnny Hekker (2012)
Punt returns – 42, LeRoy Irvin (1980)
Punt return yards – 427, Verda Smith (1949)
Kickoff returns –  56, Tony Horne (1998)
Kickoff return yards – 1,306, Tony Horne (1998)

Career
 Scoring – 1,223, Jeff Wilkins (1997–2007)
 Touchdowns – 85, Marshall Faulk (1999–2005)
 Rushing yards –  10,138, Steven Jackson (2004–2012)
 Rushing touchdowns – 58, Marshall Faulk (1999–2005)
 Passer rating – 97.2, Kurt Warner (1998–2003)
 Passing yards – 23,758, Jim Everett (1986–1993)
 Passing touchdowns – 154, Roman Gabriel (1962–1972)
Most wins by a starting quarterback – 74, Roman Gabriel (1962–1972)
 Receiving yards – 14,109, Isaac Bruce (1994–2007)
 Receptions – 942, Isaac Bruce (1994–2007)
 Net yards – 14,259 (150 rushing, 14,109 receiving), Isaac Bruce (1994–2007)
 Sacks – 159.5, Deacon Jones (1961–1971) (since all of Jones's sacks are before 1982, this is an unofficial statistic).
 Interceptions – 46, Eddie Meador (1959–1970)
 Field goals –  265, Jeff Wilkins (1997–2007)
 Punting average – 48.0, Donnie Jones (2007–2011)
 Kickoff returns –  171, Drew Hill (1979–1984)
 Kickoff return yards – 3,918, Ron Brown (1984–1989, 1991)
 Kickoff return average – 26.3, Ron Brown (1984–1989, 1991)
 Punt returns –  158, Tavon Austin (2013–2016)
 Punt return yards – 1,527, Henry Ellard (1983–1993)
 Punt return average – 11.4, Az-Zahir Hakim (1998–2001)

Playoff games
Points – 18, Tom Fears, vs. Chicago Bears, 12/17/50
Touchdowns – 3, Tom Fears, vs. Chicago Bears, 12/17/50
Field goals – 5, Jeff Wilkins, vs. Carolina Panthers, 01/10/04
Rushing yards – 248, Eric Dickerson, vs. Dallas Cowboys, 01/04/86
Rushing touchdowns – 2, four times, last by C. J. Anderson, vs. Dallas Cowboys, 01/12/19
Passing yards – 414, Kurt Warner, vs. Tennessee Titans, 01/30/00
Passing touchdowns – 5, Kurt Warner, vs. Minnesota Vikings, 01/16/00
Receptions – 9, three times, last by Robert Woods, vs Atlanta Falcons, 01/06/18
Receiving yards – 198, Tom Fears, vs. Chicago Bears, 12/17/50
Receiving touchdowns – 3, Tom Fears, vs. Chicago Bears, 12/17/50
Punts – 11, Dale Hatcher, at Chicago Bears, 01/12/86
Punt returns – 6, Eddie Brown, at Tampa Bay Buccaneers, 01/06/80
Punt return yardage – 72, Az-Zahir Hakim, vs. Minnesota Vikings, 01/16/00
Punt return touchdowns – 1, Verda Smith, at Detroit Lions, 12/21/52
Kick returns – 7, Henry Ellard, at Washington Redskins, 01/01/84
Kick return yardage – 174, Tony Horne, vs. Minnesota Vikings, 01/16/00
Interceptions – 2, four times, last by Aeneas Williams, vs. Green Bay Packers, 01/20/02
Interception return yards – 94, LeRoy Irvin, at Dallas Cowboys, 12/26/83
Sacks – 3, twice, last by Kevin Greene, at Minnesota Vikings, 12/26/88

Playoff career
Most Ram playoff game appearances – 18, Jackie Slater (1976–1994)
Points – 63, Jeff Wilkins (1997–2007)
Touchdowns – 7, Marshall Faulk (1999–2005)
Field goals – 14, Jeff Wilkins (1997–2006)
Rushing yards – 687, Lawrence McCutcheon (1972–1979)
Rushing touchdowns – 5, Marshall Faulk (1999–2005)
Passing yards – 2,221, Kurt Warner (1998–2003)
Passing touchdowns – 15, Kurt Warner (1998–2003)
Most wins by a starting quarterback – 5, Kurt Warner (1998–2003)
Receptions – 43, Marshall Faulk (1999–2005)
Receiving yards – 719, Isaac Bruce (1994–2007)
Receiving touchdowns – 5, Tom Fears (1948–1956)
Punts – 35, Bob Waterfield (1946–1952)
Punt returns – 12, Az-Zahir Hakim (1999–2001)
Punt return yardage – 12.4, Az-Zahir Hakim (1999–2001)
Kick returns – 14, Tony Horne (1999–2000) and Cullen Bryant (1973–1982, 1987)
Kick return yardage – 24.0, Tony Horne, (1999–2000)
Interceptions – 6, Bill Simpson (1974–1978)
Interception return yards – 149, LeRoy Irvin (1980–1989)
Interception touchdowns – 2, Aeneas Williams (2001–2005)
Sacks – 8.5, Jack Youngblood (1971–1984)

Most career passing yards

Most career passing touchdowns

Most career rushing yards

Most career rushing touchdowns

Most career receptions

Most career receiving yards

Most career receiving touchdowns

Notes

Statistics
American football team records and statistics